Marek Nowak (born 6 April 1967) is a Polish sports shooter. He competed in two events at the 1996 Summer Olympics.

References

1967 births
Living people
Polish male sport shooters
Olympic shooters of Poland
Shooters at the 1996 Summer Olympics
Sportspeople from Warsaw